Eva Puskarčíková (born 3 January 1991) is a former Czech biathlete.

Career
Her best result in the Biathlon World Cup is 3rd place in the pursuit in the 2016–17 season.
She competed at the 2014 Winter Olympics in Sochi. Her best result here was 3th place in relay, shared with her Czech teammates Gabriela Soukalová, Jitka Landová and Veronika Vítková. Apart from that, she also competed in sprint, pursuit and individual. On 17 March 2022 Puskarčíková announced on her social media end of career.

Record

Olympic Games
1 medals (1 bronze)World Championships1 medal (1 bronze)''

Personal life
In 2019–2020, she was married to former Czech biathlete  and competed under name Eva Kristejn Puskarčíková.

References

External links

1991 births
Living people
Olympic biathletes of the Czech Republic
Czech female biathletes
Biathletes at the 2014 Winter Olympics
Biathletes at the 2018 Winter Olympics
Biathletes at the 2022 Winter Olympics
Universiade medalists in biathlon
People from Jilemnice
Universiade silver medalists for the Czech Republic
Competitors at the 2015 Winter Universiade
Biathlon World Championships medalists
Sportspeople from the Liberec Region